Arménio Adroaldo Vieira e Silva (born January 29, 1941) is a Cape Verdean writer, poet and journalist.  He began his activity during the 1960s, collaborated in SELÓ, Boletim de Cabo Verde, Vértice (Coimbra) review, Raízes, Ponto & Vírgula, Fragmentos, Sopinha de Alfabeto and others.

Three of his poems— Lisboa (1971), Quiproquo and Ser tigre— can be found on the CD Poesia de Cabo Verde e Sete Poemas de Sebastião da Gama by Afonso Dias.

He won the Camões Prize in 2009 on the work O Poema, a Viagem, o Sonho.

His poems were celebrated by Mito Elias (also simply as Mito) in Praia and Mindelo in 2011.

He started a series of "versions of books, poetic and miscellaneous notes" in June 2013 with O Brumário, later Derivações do Brumário and recently Fantasmas e Fantasias do Brumário in 2014.

Works

1971: Lisboa (Lisbon)
Around 1971 and 1972: Quiproquo and Ser tigre
1981: Poemas - África Editora - Colecção Cântico Geral - Lisbon
1990: O Eleito do Sol - Edição Sonacor EP - Grafedito - Praia
1998: Poemas (reedited) - Ilhéu Editora - Mindelo
2006: MITOgrafias - Portuguese Cultural Center - Praia and Mindelo - novel
2009: O Poema, a Viagem, o Sonho - Caminho Publishers, Lisbon - poems
2013: O Brumário
Derivações do Brumário, 2013
Fantasmas e Fantasias do Brumário, 2014

Notes

External links
Vozes Poéticas da Lusofonia (Lusophony Poetic Voices) 
Arménio Vieira – liberdade e coerência na poesia do poeta-gato cabo-verdiano (África e Africanidades) Brazil, 2nd year, no. 6, August 2009

1941 births
Living people
Cape Verdean male writers
Cape Verdean poets
Cape Verdean journalists
People from Praia
Camões Prize winners
20th-century male writers
21st-century male writers